Bardo Chham is a folk dance traditional to the Himalayan Buddhist Tribes of Arunachal Pradesh, India. Here in, "Bardo" means "the limbo between death and rebirth" in Tibetan Buddhism, as under the Tibetan Book of Dead. While Chham, literally translates to "Dance" in "Monpa" language.  
Bardo Chham is based on the stories of the triumph of good over evil. According to the local beliefs, both good and evil exists within mankind. The dance is portrayed  with the use of traditional wooden masks, representing the different animals and characters there in.

References 

Indian folk dances
Culture of Arunachal Pradesh
Folk dances of Arunachal Pradesh